Jamileh Kadivar is an Iranian politician and a former member of parliament.

Biography
Kadivar was born in Fasa, a town near Shiraz in southern Iran. She attended school in Shiraz until she was 16 years old, when she moved to Tehran to get married. Her spouse is former Minister of Culture of Iran Ata'ollah Mohajerani and they have four children. Her brother is well-known Muslim scholar Mohsen Kadivar. She was one of the attendees of the Berlin conference and in November 2000 went on trial for taking part in anti-government and anti-Islamic activities.

References

External links
Kadivar's Persian weblog

Iranian women writers
Living people
Iranian women academics
Iranian reformists
Members of the 6th Islamic Consultative Assembly
Tehran Councillors 1999–2003
Members of the Women's fraction of Islamic Consultative Assembly
1963 births
University of Tehran alumni